This is a list of prime ministerial trips made by Mikhail Mishustin, during his premiership, which began on 16 January 2020.

List

2020

2021

2022

2023

References

External links
 Official site of the Prime Minister of Russia

Lists of 21st-century trips
Diplomatic visits from Russia
Mishustin
Russia geography-related lists
Mishustin
Mishustin